Coleman is a village in Marinette County, Wisconsin, United States. The population was 724 at the 2010 census. It is part of the Marinette, WI–MI Micropolitan Statistical Area.

Geography
Coleman is located at  (45.069654, -88.034303).

Demographics

2010 census
As of the census of 2010, there were 724 people, 315 households, and 197 families living in the village. The racial makeup of the village was 95.3% White, 0.6% African American, 1.0% Native American, 1.4% from other races, and 1.8% from two or more races. Hispanic or Latino of any race were 3.2% of the population.

There were 315 households, of which 26.7% had children under the age of 18 living with them, 46.3% were married couples living together, 9.2% had a female householder with no husband present, 7.0% had a male householder with no wife present, and 37.5% were non-families. 32.1% of all households were made up of individuals, and 13.3% had someone living alone who was 65 years of age or older. The average household size was 2.30 and the average family size was 2.86.

The median age in the village was 38.8 years. 23.6% of residents were under the age of 18; 8.2% were between the ages of 18 and 24; 23% were from 25 to 44; 28.1% were from 45 to 64; and 17% were 65 years of age or older. The gender makeup of the village was 50.6% male and 49.4% female.

2000 census
As of the census of 2000, there were 716 people, 316 households, and 199 families living in the village. The racial makeup of the village was 99.58% White, 0.14% Pacific Islander, and 0.28% from two or more races. Hispanic or Latino of any race were 0.28% of the population.

There were 316 households, out of which 27.5% had children under the age of 18 living with them, 51.3% were married couples living together, 8.9% had a female householder with no husband present, and 37.0% were non-families. 32.6% of all households were made up of individuals, and 16.1% had someone living alone who was 65 years of age or older. The average household size was 2.26 and the average family size was 2.85.

In the village, the population was spread out, with 23.9% under the age of 18, 6.4% from 18 to 24, 25.8% from 25 to 44, 23.2% from 45 to 64, and 20.7% who were 65 years of age or older. The median age was 42 years. For every 100 females, there were 95.6 males. For every 100 females age 18 and over, there were 88.6 males.

The median income for a household in the village was $35,703, and the median income for a family was $41,500. Males had a median income of $33,594 versus $21,250 for females. The per capita income for the village was $18,248. About 3.7% of families and 7.1% of the population were below the poverty line, including 9.5% of those under age 18 and 7.1% of those age 65 or over.

Images

References

External links

Coleman School District

Villages in Marinette County, Wisconsin
Villages in Wisconsin
Marinette micropolitan area